"The Adventure of the Red Circle" is one of the 56 Sherlock Holmes short stories written by Arthur Conan Doyle. It is included in the anthology His Last Bow.

Synopsis
Mrs. Warren, a landlady, comes to 221B Baker Street with some questions about her lodger. A youngish, heavily bearded man, who spoke good but accented English, came to her and offered double her usual rent on the condition that he get the room on his own terms. He went out the first night that he was there, and came back after midnight when the rest of the household had gone to bed. Since then, neither Mrs. Warren, her husband, nor their servant girl has seen him. The lodger insisted on having the Daily Gazette every morning, and sometimes requested other things. All requests were printed on a slip of paper left on a chair outside the room where meals were also left.

Mrs. Warren has brought some spent matches and a cigarette end from her lodger, hoping that Holmes can read something from them. The cigarette has been smoked almost to the butt without a holder, impracticable for a man with whiskers. The lodger also eats very little, and never receives visitors or messages.

After the landlady leaves, Holmes remarks to Dr. Watson that it seems likely that the person in Mrs. Warren's house is not the bearded man who made the arrangements. The evidence lies not only in the cigarette, but in the fact that the lodger's knowledge of English is not as good as the bearded man's (they wrote MATCH as one of their requests, for instance, not MATCHES). Their "return" on the first night was very late so that no-one would see them and they have taken great pains to ensure no-one has seen them since.

Holmes suspects that messages are being sent to the lodger, perhaps in the Daily Gazette's agony column. He finds them: "Will find some sure means of communication. Meanwhile, this column. G." (posted only two days after the lodger's arrival), "Am making successful arrangements. Patience and prudence. The clouds will pass. G." (three days later), and "The path is clearing. If I find chance signal message remember code agreed–one A, two B, and so on. You will hear soon. G." (yesterday). Holmes needs only wait one day for a very useful message: "High red house with white stone facings. Third floor. Second window left. After dusk. G." Holmes decides that it is time to reconnoitre Mrs. Warren's neighbourhood.

Just then, Mrs. Warren arrives complaining that her husband was kidnapped that morning and taken by cab to Hampstead Heath where he was unceremoniously cast onto the roadway. He never got a clear look at his kidnappers or their cab. Holmes realizes that the ruffians mistook Mr. Warren for the lodger, and dumped him after they realized their mistake.

Holmes and Watson go to Mrs. Warren's house just before lunchtime, hoping to catch a glimpse of the lodger retrieving the lunch tray. Before going in, Holmes observes that the lodger's window commands a good view down Howe Street, and at the other end is a house matching the one mentioned in the agony column.

In Mrs. Warren's house, Holmes and Watson hide in a boxroom. By using a mirror they see the lodger take the lunch tray from the hall chair, discovering that the mysterious person is a comely-featured young woman with a dark complexion. They realize that she has been carefully printing (rather than writing in common handwriting) her requests to hide her gender. It is equally clear that she and her bearded confederate, likely a lover or husband, are in some kind of danger and seeking refuge. From the lodger's horror at suspecting a trick at lunchtime, and the exceptional precautions that have been taken to ensure secrecy, it must be a matter of life and death.

That evening, Holmes and Watson are on hand to see the lodger's confederate's lantern-signals, sent by a waving candle. The first message says "Attenta, attenta, attenta!" (Beware, beware, beware!). It becomes clear that they are Italian, and from the "-a" ending that the message is meant for a woman. The signaller then flashes "Pericolo" ("Danger") and then "Peri-".

Realizing that the signaller has been interrupted, Holmes and Watson rush to the house and are surprised to meet Inspector Gregson and a Pinkerton detective from the United States named Leverton (described by Holmes as "the hero of the Long Island cave mystery"). They are lying in wait for Giuseppe Gorgiano, a vicious killer of whose infamy Holmes is well aware. The house has only one door and they know that he is inside. Gregson and Leverton have been unaware of the signalled messages. Gregson says that three men have come out of the house, but none was Gorgiano, who is a giant. One, however, matched the description of the man who made the arrangements at Mrs. Warren's.

Going into the house and to the room where the signalling came from, Holmes, Watson, Gregson, and Leverton discover a grisly scene. The giant Gorgiano lies on the floor in a pool of blood from having been impaled with a large knife, apparently in a fight. The bearded man is undoubtedly the killer. The lady's arriving at the door shortly afterward is a surprise to everyone but Holmes, who had impersonated the lady's confederate by re-lighting the same candle that her confederate had used, and signalling in Italian for her to come.

Her name is Emilia Lucca, and her confederate is Gennaro, her husband. The men are rather taken aback by her obvious joy at this ghastly sight. She confirms that the Luccas were seeking refuge from the dangerous Giuseppe Gorgiano, who was out to kill Gennaro for betraying the Red Circle, a secret criminal organization that Gennaro had become involved in as a heatedly-resentful young man who was furious at world injustices. Gennaro had never actually participated in any of the society's crimes, however, and had eventually decided to leave the organization in spite of the threatened consequences. He and his wife fled Italy and went to New York to escape the Red Circle, but Gorgiano, another member, discovered Gennaro there, and contrived to oblige him to murder a good friend, a man who had gotten Gennaro started in legitimate business in the U.S.

Gennaro had no intention of doing such a thing, and even warned his friend of the Red Circle's orders. The police were also informed. The Luccas then fled to England where Gorgiano tracked Gennaro down, intending to kill him and abduct the lovely Emilia, to whom he had developed a lustful attraction. Gorgiano died in the ensuing fight, however.

Gregson feels compelled to take Emilia down to the police station, and the same fate probably awaits Gennaro, but as their actions had been purely in self-defense, it seems likely that there will be no charges.

Publication history
"The Adventure of the Red Circle" was first published in the UK in The Strand Magazine in March–April 1911, and in the United States in the US edition of the Strand in April–May 1911. The story was published with three illustrations by H. M. Brock and one by Joseph Simpson in The Strand Magazine, and with the same illustrations in the US edition of the Strand. It was included in the short story collection His Last Bow, which was published in the UK and the US in October 1917.

Adaptations

Film and television
The story was adapted as a short silent film in 1922. It was one of the short films in the Sherlock Holmes film series by Stoll Pictures, and starred Eille Norwood as Sherlock Holmes and Hubert Willis as Dr. Watson.

The 1945 film Pursuit to Algiers sources some of its characters from this story.

The 1994 Granada TV series adaptation (entitled merely "The Red Circle") makes several key modifications to the short story: The episode introduces a new character (Enrico Formani, an Italian expatriate who is murdered by Gorgiano, possibly indirectly as a result of Watson blowing Formani's cover). Inspector Gregson is replaced by Inspector Hawkins. Gorgiano makes an attempt to infiltrate the Warrens' house and kidnap Emilia. He is chased away by Leverton. Emilia notices Holmes and Watson in the boxroom, realizes she has been seen and quickly locks her door. With coaxing and explanations by Holmes, the frightened woman hesitantly unlocks the door. Holmes enters Emilia's room and speaks with her, hearing the story of how she and her husband ended up involved with the Red Circle. Emilia arrives at the scene of the fight between Gorgiano and Gennaro before Holmes and his party do.

Radio

"The Adventure of the Red Circle" was adapted by Edith Meiser as an episode of the American radio series The Adventures of Sherlock Holmes. The episode, which aired on 15 October 1931, featured Richard Gordon as Sherlock Holmes and Leigh Lovell as Dr. Watson. Another production of the story aired in February 1935, with Louis Hector as Holmes and Lovell as Watson.

The story was also adapted for the American radio series The New Adventures of Sherlock Holmes. The radio adaptation, starring Basil Rathbone and Nigel Bruce, was titled "Mrs. Warren's Lodger" and aired on 7 December 1941, the day of the Japanese attack on Pearl Harbor. The East Coast broadcast was interrupted by a radio announcement that President Franklin D. Roosevelt would be addressing the nation at noon the following day.

The story was adapted for BBC Radio 2 in 1969 by Michael Hardwick, as part of the 1952–1969 radio series starring Carleton Hobbs as Holmes and Norman Shelley as Watson.

"The Red Circle" was dramatised for BBC Radio 4 in 1994 by Peter Ling as part of the 1989–1998 radio series starring Clive Merrison as Holmes and Michael Williams as Watson, featuring Joan Sims as Mrs Warren.

In 2013, the story was adapted as an episode of The Classic Adventures of Sherlock Holmes, a series on the American radio show Imagination Theatre, with John Patrick Lowrie as Holmes and Lawrence Albert as Watson.

Of note 
This is the last appearance of Inspector Tobias Gregson in Doyle's work.  Explanations for this have been a matter of debate for readers.  Although Gregson's meeting with Holmes is coincidental, he is swift to grasp the implications of getting his help and claims to have been grateful for his work with the Yard in the past.

The Pinkerton detective Leverton is called "the hero of the Long Island cave mystery" by Holmes. But there is no explanation of what the Long Island cave mystery entailed. This is considered by some to be one of untold cases of the Holmesian canon, though it doesn't seem to have involved Holmes. This mystery seems paradoxical because there are no real caves on Long Island, New York, but there are caves on Long Island, in the Bahamas.

Howe Street is a creation of Conan Doyle, overlooking Orme Street, which is commonly known as Great Ormond Street located in Central London, northeast from the British Museum.  Watson describes Orme as a "narrow thoroughfare" and Howe in possession of "more pretentious houses."

References
Notes

Sources

External links
 

 
  produced by Granada Television (1994)

Red Circle, The Adventure of the
1911 short stories
Short stories adapted into films
Works originally published in The Strand Magazine